Archery at the 1984 Summer Olympics was contested in the format used since 1972.  There were two events: men's individual and women's individual. Points were in a format called the double FITA round, which included 288 arrows shot over four days at four different distances: 70 meters, 60 meters, 50 meters, 30 meters for women; 90 meters, 70 meters, 50 meters, 30 meters for men.  It was the fourth, and last, time that the format was used in Olympic competition.

Neroli Fairhall from New Zealand, who came 35th in the Women's individual event, was the first paraplegic athlete to compete at the Olympic Games.

Medal summary

Events

Medal table

Participating nations

See also
 Archery at the Friendship Games

References

External links
Official Olympic Report

 
1984
1984 Summer Olympics events
1984 in archery